Kim Yaroshevskaya (born October 1, 1923) is a Russian-born Canadian film, television and stage actress. Best known to audiences in Quebec as a children's entertainer, starring in series such as Fanfreluche and Passe-Partout in the 1970s, she also had a starring role in the English Canadian drama series Home Fires in the early 1980s.

Background
Born in Moscow, Soviet Union, Yaroshevskaya emigrated to Quebec at age ten with her family. In the 1950s, she was a founding member of the Quebec theatre collective Théâtre Le Grenier, with whom she created Fanfreluche.

Career
Her other film and television roles have included A Woman in Transit (La Femme de l'hôtel), The Alley Cat (Le Matou), Anne Trister, Straight for the Heart (À corps perdu), The Sex of the Stars (Le Sexe des étoiles) and L'Amour avec un Grand A. Her stage roles have included productions of Aristophanes' Lysistrata, Samuel Beckett's Play, Jean-Pierre Ronfard's Le Grand theatre du monde, Athol Fugard's The Road to Mecca and Ted Galay's After Baba's Funeral and Sweet and Sour Pickles.

In recent years she has published several works of children's literature, including La Petite Kim (Little Kim's Doll), Contes de fanfreluche, tome 1 : Connaissez-vous le petit chaperon bleu et petit chaperon jaune? and Contes d'humour et de sagesse.

In November 2017 Yaroshevskaya, then aged 94, released her biography, Mon voyage en Amérique.

Honours
She was nominated for an ACTRA Award in 1981 for her role in Home Fires. She was named a Member of the Order of Canada in 1991.

References

External links

1923 births
Living people
Actresses from Montreal
Actresses from Moscow
Canadian children's television personalities
Canadian children's writers in French
Canadian women children's writers
Canadian film actresses
Canadian stage actresses
Canadian television actresses
Members of the Order of Canada
Television personalities from Montreal
Soviet emigrants to Canada
Writers from Montreal
Writers from Moscow
Canadian women television personalities